The Phillip Burton Wilderness is  part of the 111 sq. mile (288 km2) Point Reyes National Seashore located about  northeast of San Francisco, California. The National Park Service manages the wilderness.

The wilderness is named for California's  Congressman Phillip Burton who served in the US House of Representatives from 1964 until his death on April 10, 1983.

The US Congress passed legislation (Public Law 94-544) in 1976 that created the Point Reyes Wilderness, and in 1985, Congress, in  recognition of  Burton's dedication to wilderness preservation, especially his work on the California Wilderness Act of 1984,  renamed the wilderness after him (P.L. 99-68).

"...his leadership in establishing units of the National Park System and preserving their integrity against threats to those resources ... his tireless efforts that led to the enactment of the California Wilderness Act ... shall henceforth be known as the "Phillip Burton Wilderness."

Wilderness areas
There are three separate units:

The Southeastern area protects the Inverness Ridge down to a long coastline and is the largest unit. Within this area are forests of Douglas fir and California buckeye, coastal foothills, terraces, caves, beaches, several small inland lakes and the high point of Mount Wittenberg. The four trailcamps are in this section, with Wildcat and Coast camps located near shore, and Sky and Glen camps inland.  Each camp has a different number of individual sites, with 52 sites total and four group sites.

The Central section, which is separated from the southeastern unit by Limantour Road, protects the crest of the Inverness Ridge, the east shore of  Estero de Limantour and the Limantour Spit. An endemic (restricted to one area) and rare coastal pine known as the Bishop pine grows here.

The North segment includes the Tomales Point area, which is an open grassland peninsula that separates the Pacific Ocean to the west from the Tomales Bay, a submerged valley, on the east. A reserve for the reintroduced tule elk is in this section.  Although there are no trailcamps, boat-in camping is allowed on Tomales Bay.

Nearly half of the Point Reyes National Seashore is within the Phillip Burton Wilderness and has one of the most diverse landscapes of the California coast. The United Nations' Biosphere Program, which began in the 1970s to preserve the world's major biotic regions, included the Point Reyes area in 1988 when it designated the Central California Coast Biosphere Reserve (now the Golden Gate Biosphere Reserve) in recognition of the vast array of plants, animals and ecosystems. This is the first U.S. biosphere reserve firmly integrated within a large metropolitan area that is home to over 8 million people.
There are at least 42 rare and endangered plants of the more than 850 plant species identified. Almost 40 species of land mammals plus a dozen marine mammals such as the harbor seal live or migrate through this area. Bird species counts are well over 400.

Wilderness regulations

Backpacking
A permit is required for backpacking trips to any of the four trailcamps, and this is limited to one night.  Permits must be reserved in advance and picked up at the Bear Valley Visitor Center and fees are charged. Campsites can be reserved three months in advance.  All four trailcamps allow bicycle access but no dogs.

Day hikes
The  of trails offer the full spectrum of landscapes from the Douglas fir forests on the Inverness Ridge to the sandy beaches, rocky headlands and salt marshes near the ocean and estuaries. Cross-country travel is allowed but caution is advised as there are poison oak, stinging nettles, unstable cliffs and fragile meadows. Several miles of trail are open to bicycles and horseback riders, and at least one trail allows leashed pets.

The legislation that created the wilderness contains special provisions, one of which allows mechanized vehicles on four trails or closed roads within the wilderness boundaries.

Boat camping
Boat-in overnight camping is allowed with permit on the westside beaches of Tomales Bay. A required beachfire permit is available at no charge. There are 10 boat-in campsites along the wilderness portion of Tomales Bay (see map).

The Bear Valley Visitor Center has copies of the recommended brochure "Backpack Camping Information".

Bishop pine

Although the bishop pine (Pinus muricata) varies in growth habit it is always found within 12 miles of the Pacific Ocean. It has vexed scientists for decades for several reasons, including the apparent inability to breed between the northern and southern varieties of bishop pine. No such cross barrier has ever been seen elsewhere in the pine species.

The bishop pines of the Phillip Burton Wilderness are considered an "intermediate" between the northern variety (Pinus muricata v. borealis) and the southern (Pinus muricata v. muricata).

Native rare plants
The Point Reyes area has more than 50 species of rare, threatened or endangered plants. Perennial wildflowers include the yellow larkspur (Delphinium luteum), federally listed as endangered under the Endangered Species Act in 2000, and state listed as rare since 1979. It has yellow flowers that bloom from March through May, grows in plant communities of coastal scrub, and is extremely poisonous (major toxicity class 1 ). Rare grasses include the endemic Sonoma shortawn foxtail (Alopecurus aequalis var. sonomensis) in the family Poaceae, federally listed as endangered since 1997. The California Native Plant Society lists this subspecies population as seriously endangered, and that more taxonomic information is needed. In addition to the bishop pine, there is the Monterey cypress (Callitropsis macrocarpa), a closed-cone conifer.

Tule elk

The Tule Elk Reserve comprises 2,600 acres and was started in 1978 by the National Park Service (NPS). By 2000 the elk herd had increased in size to the point that it had outgrown the restricted area.  NPS relocated about 50 animals to the Phillip Burton Wilderness section near Drake's Bay.

A full-grown elk can weigh 500 pounds or more and run at the speed of a racehorse. The elk were California's version of the bison and roamed freely in massive herds, up to half a million, until the mid-19th century when they were wiped out by hunting and believed extinct.  In 1874, a small group was discovered in a marsh thicket on the cattle ranch of Henry Miller near Bakersfield, California. Miller set aside some of his property for this herd, which survived, and 100 years later, the tule elk received federal protection under the Tule Elk Preservation Act (P.L. 94-38) that was passed on August 14, 1976.

Today, there are more elk in the state than at any time since Abraham Lincoln's presidency.

With over 2.3 million visitors to the park in 2007,  the wilderness receives very heavy use and the Leave No Trace (LNT) ethics are enforced for the benefit of everyone. The required permit is considered a signed contract of agreement to treat the wilderness with respect by employing the LNT techniques that minimize human impact to the environment

Notes

References

Books
.
.

Internet
NPS - Point Reyes National Seashore website
Wilderness.net - Phillip Burton Wilderness laws
Georgewright.org - Madrid, Spain UN Conference Report
KQED-TV online reprint of tule elk report, "Elk Return to the Bay", episode 105, March 20, 2007

External links
National Park Service. Accessed Jan 1, 2009.
Description of the Golden Gate Biosphere Reserve.  Accessed Jan. 1, 2009.
Link to reprint of KQED-TV story.  Accessed Jan 1, 2009.

West Marin
Wilderness areas of California
Protected areas of Marin County, California
Point Reyes National Seashore